Jerome Williams may refer to:

Jerome Williams (basketball) (born 1973)
Jerome Williams (baseball) (born 1981)
Jerome Binnom-Williams (born 1995), footballer
JJ Williams (soccer) (born 1998)

See also
Jerry Williams (disambiguation)
Gerome Williams (born 1973), American football player